Weather Systems, released in 2003, is Andrew Bird's second solo album and his first after disbanding Bowl of Fire. Bird has said that the album was simply a side project during his four or five year recording of Andrew Bird & the Mysterious Production of Eggs. At least two of the songs on the album suggest this fact: "I" is a slower, more dreary version of Armchair Apocrypha "Imitosis," and "Skin" is a similarly slow, instrumental version of The Mysterious Production of Eggs "Skin is, My."

The disk features an eight-minute film by Bob Trondson about Bird and the recording of the album. The cover art was done by Jay Ryan.

The first track, "First Song," borrows its title and most of its lyrics from a poem in Galway Kinnell's book, What a Kingdom It Was, published in 1960. The penultimate song, "Don't Be Scared," is Bird's version of a song written and performed originally by The Handsome Family.

Track listing

Other appearances

 The track "I" is an early version of "Imitosis", which appears on Armchair Apocrypha.
 "Skin" appears on the album The Mysterious Production of Eggs as "Skin is, My".
 "Don't Be Scared" is originally performed by The Handsome Family on the album Down in the Valley. A newer version by Bird appears on the cover album, Things Are Really Great Here, Sort Of….

Andrew Bird albums
2003 albums
Righteous Babe Records albums